Smokin' with the Chet Baker Quintet is an album by trumpeter Chet Baker which was recorded in 1965 and released on the Prestige label.

Reception

Scott Yanow of Allmusic states, "these sessions let one know he could break through his "cool" image by playing heated bop when he wanted to. It also finds him debuting on fluegelhorn and the softer tone of the horn fit his introverted sound well".

Track listing 
 "Grade "A" Gravy" (Richard Carpenter, Gladys Bruce) - 6:27  
 "Serenity" (Carpenter, Bruce) - 5:21  
 "Fine and Dandy" (Isham Jones, Kay Swift) - 7:23  
 "Have You Met Miss Jones?" (Lorenz Hart, Richard Rodgers) - 6:38  
 "Rearin' Back" (Carpenter, Sonny Stitt) - 6:04  
 "So Easy" (Tadd Dameron) - 6:52

Personnel 
Chet Baker - flugelhorn
George Coleman - tenor saxophone
Kirk Lightsey - piano
Herman Wright - bass
Roy Brooks - drums

References 

Chet Baker albums
1965 albums
Prestige Records albums